Jenia Grebennikov (born 13 August 1990) is a French volleyball player of Russian descent. He is part of the French national team, 2020 Olympic Champion, two–time World League winner (2015, 2017), 2015 European Champion. At the professional club level, he plays for the Russian team, Zenit Saint Petersburg.

Personal life
Jenia Grebennikov was born in Rennes, France. His father Boris Grebennikov is a former Soviet and Kazakh volleyball player and coach. He married his longtime girlfriend Wiem on 31 December 2018.

Career

Clubs
In April 2015, he signed a contract with the Italian team, Cucine Lube Civitanova.

National team
Jenia Grebennikov debuted on the French national team in 2011. In 2014 he played at the World Championship 2014 held in Poland.<ref>[http://poland2014.fivb.org/en/competition/teams/FRA-France France - team profile] - fivb.org</ref> France lost the match for the bronze medal with Germany and took 4th place. Grebennikov received an individual award for the Best Libero of the tournament. On October 18, 2015 the French national team, including Grebennikov, achieved the title of the European Champion 2015 (3–0 with Slovenia in the finale). He was awarded Best Libero of the championships.

Sporting achievements
Clubs
 CEV Champions League
  2017/2018 – with Cucine Lube Civitanova

 FIVB Club World Championship
  Poland 2017 – with Cucine Lube Civitanova
  Poland 2018 – with Trentino Volley

 CEV Cup
  2018/2019 – with Trentino Volley

 National championships
 2011/2012  French Cup, with Rennes Volley 35
 2013/2014  German Cup, with VfB Friedrichshafen
 2014/2015  German Cup, with VfB Friedrichshafen
 2014/2015  German Championship, with VfB Friedrichshafen
 2016/2017  Italian Cup, with Cucine Lube Civitanova
 2016/2017  Italian Championship, with Cucine Lube Civitanova

Individual awards
 2011: French Championship – Best Libero
 2012: French Championship – Most Valuable Player
 2012: French Championship – Best Libero
 2014: FIVB World Championship – Best Libero
 2015: CEV European Championship – Best Libero
 2016: CEV Champions League – Best Libero
 2016: FIVB World League – Best Libero
 2017: CEV Champions League – Best Libero
 2017: FIVB Club World Championship – Best Libero
 2018: CEV Champions League – Best Libero
 2018: FIVB Nations League – Best Libero
 2018: FIVB Club World Championship – Best Libero
 2021: Olympic Games – Best Libero
 2022: FIVB Nations League – Best Libero

State awards
 2021:  Knight of the Legion of Honour

References

External links

 
 Player profile at LegaVolley.it 
 
 
 Player profile at Volleybox.net''

1990 births
Living people
Sportspeople from Rennes
French people of Russian descent
French men's volleyball players
Olympic volleyball players of France
Olympic medalists in volleyball
Medalists at the 2020 Summer Olympics
Olympic gold medalists for France
Volleyball players at the 2016 Summer Olympics
Volleyball players at the 2020 Summer Olympics
French expatriate sportspeople in Germany
Expatriate volleyball players in Germany
French expatriate sportspeople in Italy
Expatriate volleyball players in Italy
French expatriate sportspeople in Russia
Expatriate volleyball players in Russia
Volley Lube players
Trentino Volley players
Modena Volley players
VC Zenit Saint Petersburg players
Liberos
21st-century French people